Henry Wynne Pearce Jr. (November 7, 1928 – December 11, 1990) was an American television actor. He was known for playing the role of "Deputy Marshal Steve Corbie" in the first season of the American western television series Outlaws.

Life and career 
Pearce was born in Orange, Texas, the son of a physician. He served in the United States Army, later being discharged in 1954. Pearce began his career in 1955 in New York, in which he covered for actor, Andy Griffith in playing Captain Charles in the Broadway play No Time for Sergeants. He then played Arthur in the Broadway play Maybe Tuesday, in 1958. With his film and television career, Pearce joined the cast of the western television series Outlaws for its first season, in which he played the role of "Deputy Marshal Steve Corbie", after Jock Gaynor left the series after nine episodes. Gaynor played the role of "Deputy Marshal Heck Martin".

Pearce guest-starred in television programs including Gunsmoke, Bonanza, 12 O'Clock High, Perry Mason, Maverick, Tales of Wells Fargo, Sugarfoot, The Phil Silvers Show and 77 Sunset Strip. In 1968, he played the lead role of "Sir Charles Dilke" in Michael Dynes's presentation. Pearce attended at University of Southern California, where he earned his master's degree. After attending, he worked at the University of Arizona, where Pearce taught about theatre occupations such as, performing and directing. He also worked at the United States International University in San Diego, California, where he then later worked at the public community college Saddleback College, in which Pearce was a academic professor, from 1974.

Death 
Pearce died in December 1990 of an illness in San Clemente, California, at the age of 62. His body was cremated.

References

External links 
 
 
 
 Rotten Tomatoes profile

1928 births
1990 deaths
People from Orange, Texas
Male actors from Texas
American male television actors
American male stage actors
20th-century American male actors
University of Southern California alumni
Alliant International University faculty
20th-century American academics
University of Arizona faculty
Saddleback College people
Western (genre) television actors